The Bears' Famous Invasion of Sicily,
also known as The Bears and the Invasion of Sicily in the United States, is a 2019 Italian-French traditionally animated adventure film directed by Lorenzo Mattotti. The screenplay by Mattotti, Jean-Luc Fromental and Thomas Bidegain is based on the 1945 Italian children's book The Bears' Famous Invasion of Sicily by Dino Buzzati.

The film was selected to be screened in the Un Certain Regard section at the 2019 Cannes Film Festival. Pathé distributed the film in France on 9 October 2019 and by BIM Distribuzione in Italy on 7 November 2019. It received critical acclaim.

Cast

Production
The film is produced by the French company Prima Linea Productions. It is co-produced with Pathé and France 3 Cinéma in France and Indigo Films and Rai Cinema in Italy. It has a budget of €11 million. It received financial support from Canal+ and the CNC. It received 375,000 euros from the Ile-de-France region's Support Fund for Film and Audiovisual Technical Industries. The project also won the Gan Foundation's Special Prize for 2016.

The visual style is inspired by Buzzati's illustrations but also independent from the original book. The landscapes are inspired by real Mediterranean landscapes with liberties taken in order to create a fairytale-like atmosphere. Mattotti's ambition was to create a timeless visual style so that people who view the film in the future will not be able to see when it was made.

The film was in production in November 2016. In a November 2016 interview, Mattotti expected it to be released in two or three years.

Reception

Critical response 
On review aggregator website Rotten Tomatoes, the film holds an approval rating of  based on  reviews. Oneofus.net called the movie an "charming experience" and "refreshingly different" giving the adults a strong recommendation to take children see it.

References

External links

 Official website

Animated films about bears
French animated feature films
Animated films based on children's books
Films based on works by Dino Buzzati
Films set in Sicily
Italian animated films
Films with screenplays by Thomas Bidegain
2019 films
2010s French films